Skolwin is a municipal neighbourhood of the city of Szczecin, Poland situated on the left bank of the Oder river, north of Szczecin Old Town and Middle Town, and south of the town of Police. As of January 2011, it had a population of 3,265.

Before 1945, when Szczecin (then Stettin) was a part of Germany, the German name of this suburb was Stettin-Odermunde.

In Skolwin, there is a power line crossing of the Odra river, which is part of 220 kV powerline Police-Morzyczyn.

The association football club Świt Szczecin is based in Skolwin.

References 

Skolwin